The Bass Pro Shops Night Race is a NASCAR Cup Series stock car race held at Bristol Motor Speedway in Bristol, Tennessee. It is one of two NASCAR Cup Series races held at Bristol, the other being the Food City Dirt Race, but it is by far the more popular of the two . From 1978 to 2019, the race has been held in late August, typically on the last weekend of the month, on a Saturday night.

The race is currently the final race in the NASCAR playoffs' Round of 16.

History
From 2001 to 2015, Newell Rubbermaid has been the title sponsor of the race, and until 2009 their marker pen brand Sharpie lent its name to the race. Newell Rubbermaid elected to change the race branding to promote one of its other brands, Irwin Industrial Tools. For the 2016 season, the main title sponsor switched to outdoor recreational retailer Bass Pro Shops

In 2020, the race was moved from its traditional August date to mid-September, becoming the NASCAR playoffs' Round of 16 elimination race.

Past winners

Notes
1961: Relief driver Johnny Allen drove the race for Jack Smith; Smith is credited with the win for starting the race.
1963: Relief driver Ned Jarrett drove the race for Fred Lorenzen; Lorenzen is credited with the win for starting the race.
1971: Relief driver Raymond Hassler drove the race for Charlie Glotzbach; Glotzbach is credited with the win for starting the race.
1978: Race changed to become a Saturday night event.
1983: Race shortened due to rain.
2016: Race started on Saturday night but was finished on Sunday afternoon due to rain.

Track length notes
1961–1968: 0.5 mile course
1969: 0.527 mile course
1970–present: 0.533 mile course

Multiple winners (drivers)

Multiple winners (teams)

Manufacturer wins

Notable races
 1964: Richard Petty led 442 laps but broke the rear end coming to the white flag and Fred Lorenzen erased a deficit of several laps to take the win.
 1969: David Pearson survived multiple wrecks to win the first race with Bristol's new banking; the track banked its turns from 18 degrees to 36 to boost speeds; the change was criticized by most drivers due to the speeds, the resulting wrecks, and the greatly increased physical strain.
 1971: Charlie Glotzbach needed relief help from Friday Hassler to post the win, the first for the new Richard Howard Chevrolet team wrenched by Junior Johnson; the race was run caution-free.
 1973: Benny Parsons needed relief help from John Ustman to post his only win of the season; it was enough to help win the season championship.
 1974: Neil Bonnett tore open forty feet of inside guardrail but was uninjured.  On the final lap, Cale Yarborough forearmed Buddy Baker sideways out of the lead; the win was the first for Junior Johnson since Carling Brewery sponsorship helped him purchase the team from Richard Howard.
 1977: Janet Guthrie needed relief help from John Utsman, who drove Guthrie's Chevrolet home sixth, the best NASCAR finish of Guthrie's career.  Cale Yarborough took the win, his eighth of the season.
 1978: Yarborough took the win in the first night running of the Volunteer 500.  Following the announcement that Darrell Waltrip would drive for Harry Ranier in 1979, Ranier's present driver Lennie Pond got into several on-track skirmishes with Waltrip.
 1979: Richard Petty won the final pole of his driving career and finished second to Darrell Waltrip.
 1981: Waltrip finished a season sweep of Bristol races has Dale Earnhardt survived a brutal crash into pit road.
 1984: After seven straight wins by Waltrip, Terry Labonte ended the streak by scratching to his second win of the 1984 season, a key win in his run to the '84 title.
 1990: After Dale Earnhardt fell back Ernie Irvan beat Rusty Wallace in a late sprint to his first win.
 1992: The track was resurfaced in concrete, and Darrell Waltrip took his final Bristol win.
 1993: Fatigue affected Rusty Wallace as Mark Martin took the win, his third straight of 1993.
 1995: Multiple crashes and the start being delayed by rain pushed the finish past midnight. Rusty Wallace was spun by Dale Earnhardt on lap 33, with NASCAR black-flagging Earnhardt and sending him to the tail of the lead lap. Bobby Hamllton received a similar penalty for twice wrecking Brett Bodine. Earnhardt worked his way back through the field and caught leader Terry Labonte on the final lap as he ran into lapped traffic. Earnhardt got into Labonte coming off turn 4 and spun him into the wall crossing the stripe, although Labonte still claimed the win and infamously drove his wrecked Chevrolet Monte-Carlo into victory lane. A furious Wallace threw a water bottle at Earnhardt during their post-race exchange.
 1998: Mark Martin took the win and dedicated the race to his father Julian, who had died weeks earlier in a plane crash.
 1999: Terry Labonte was leading with less than ten laps to go when he was spun out by Darrell Waltrip as they checked up for a caution. Labonte pitted for fresh tires and staged a furious charge from sixth to the lead, moving Dale Earnhardt for the lead coming to the white flag. Earnhardt responded by spinning Labonte in turn 2 on the final lap, wiping out several other leading cars in the process. The win was booed savagely by the surprised audience, with Earnhardt famously quoting that he never intended to wreck Labonte, and that he only meant to “rattle his cage”. Labonte's crew chief Andy Graves bitterly described "two washed-up former champions" (Waltrip and Earnhardt).
 2002: Jeff Gordon won after doing a bump-and-run in the last laps on Rusty Wallace. Gordon and Dale Earnhardt Jr. were the dominant drivers, Earnhardt leading the opening 130 laps. The race was full of flaring tempers, a lot of people ended up being  summoned for various reasons to the Big Red Truck. One of these examples was Ward Burton, who threw his brake pads at Earnhardt after Earnhardt wrecked him in turn 3 on lap 403.
 2003: After a post race confrontation with Kurt Busch at Michigan, Jimmy Spencer was suspended for a week by NASCAR.  Busch was booed when he took the win.
 2005-8: Roush-Fenway Racing won four straight Sharpie 500s with the wins split by Matt Kenseth (2005 & 2006) and Carl Edwards (2007 & 2008).
 2010: Kyle Busch won after dominating despite a tire going down on the final lap. This put Busch in the record books as the first driver to sweep all three top series' races on the same track on the same weekend, dubbed "The Trifecta". He also won the Camping World Truck race on Wednesday night and the Nationwide race on Friday night. Out of a possible 956 laps, he led 116 out of 206 in the truck event (race ended with G-W-C finish six laps past the scheduled distance of 200), 116 of 250 in the Nationwide event, and 282 of 500 in the Cup event. Together he led 514 of 956 laps or about 53.8% of the laps run.
 2012: Denny Hamlin won, holding off Jeff Gordon and Jimmie Johnson. This was the first race after the top groove had been reground, leading to the return of bump-and-run racing. There were several on-track altercations. On lap 333, Matt Kenseth and Tony Stewart tangled fighting for the lead, and Stewart responded by throwing his helmet at Kenseth hood. Later, Danica Patrick was wrecked by Regan Smith and wagged her finger at him.
 2013: Matt Kenseth held off Kasey Kahne over the last 40 laps to win his fifth race of the season. This was the third race of the season where Kahne was within striking distance of the lead but was just unable to overtake Kenseth.
 2017: Kyle Busch wins and sweeps all three top series' races for the second time at Bristol, having won the Camping World Truck race on Wednesday night and the Xfinity race on Friday night.

References

External links
 

1961 establishments in Tennessee
 
NASCAR Cup Series races
Recurring sporting events established in 1961
Annual sporting events in the United States